Spelaeovulcania canariensis is a species of beetle in the family Carabidae, the only species in the genus Spelaeovulcania.

References

Trechinae